The Cheongyang chili pepper is a medium-sized chili cultivar of the species Capsicum annuum, with intensity of 10,000 Scoville heat units. Cheongyang chili peppers look similar to regular Korean chili peppers, but are many times spicier.

The chilli is a local speciality of Cheongyang County in South Korea. However, it was named after Cheongsong and Yeongyang Counties when developed by Yoo Il-Woong, by hybridizing local Jejudo chilli with Thai chilli.  The fruits can be  light purple or green when unripe, and darken to a deep red as they ripen.  The peppers retain their dark red color when dried.

References

Chili peppers
Capsicum cultivars
Korean vegetables